Stevan Pletikosić (born 14 March 1972 in Kragujevac, Serbia, then SFR Yugoslavia) is a sport shooter from Serbia. While still a junior, he won a bronze medal in Men's 50 m Rifle Prone in the 1992 Summer Olympics. The year before, at the 1991 ISSF World Cup in the same event, he had become the only junior ever to achieve the maximum score of 600 in a world-class competition.

Pletikosić started competing in 1982, when he was 10 years old. He won a first medal at the European Championships winning a silver at the 1989 European Shooting Championships in Zagreb, SFR Yugoslavia. During his career, he won another European silver medal and was European champion twice. His first international medal was won at the 1994 ISSF World Shooting Championships, which was also a silver medal. Yugoslav Olympic Committee proclaimed him sportsman of the year in 1994. Pletikosić also won a silver in the 2006 ISSF World Shooting Championships, now in the Three positions event, and he won the 2008 ISSF World Cup competition in the Prone event in Rio de Janeiro.

Results at the Olympic Games

World records

Notes

External links
 DatabaseOlympics.com

1972 births
Serbian male sport shooters
ISSF rifle shooters
Shooters at the 1992 Summer Olympics
Shooters at the 1996 Summer Olympics
Shooters at the 2000 Summer Olympics
Shooters at the 2004 Summer Olympics
Shooters at the 2008 Summer Olympics
Shooters at the 2016 Summer Olympics
Olympic shooters as Independent Olympic Participants
Olympic shooters of Yugoslavia
Olympic shooters of Serbia and Montenegro
Olympic shooters of Serbia
Olympic bronze medalists as Independent Olympic Participants
World record holders in shooting
Sportspeople from Kragujevac
Living people
Olympic medalists in shooting
European Games competitors for Serbia
Shooters at the 2015 European Games
Medalists at the 1992 Summer Olympics
Mediterranean Games silver medalists for Yugoslavia
Competitors at the 1997 Mediterranean Games
Competitors at the 2005 Mediterranean Games
Mediterranean Games gold medalists for Serbia
Mediterranean Games medalists in shooting